Over the falls may be:

Over the falls, when a surfer falls off the board and the wave sucks them up in a circular motion along with the lip of the wave. Also referred to as the "wash cycle", being "pitched over" and being "sucked over"
"Over the Falls", the fourth track on the Brown Album by Primus
Over the Falls in a barrel, things that have gone over Niagara Falls